Natalia Leontievna Barbashina (born 26 August 1973) is a Russian football coach and former player. Her last team was Zvezda Perm, with whom she reached the 2008-09 UEFA Women's Cup Final. Throughout her career she won nine Russian women's football championships and nine national Cups with Energiya Voronezh, Ryazan VDV, Lada Togliatti, Rossiyanka and Zvezda.

International career
Barbashina joined the Russia women's national football team in 1995.

As of 2011, Barbashina was the fifth most capped Russian international player. She played at the 1999 and 2003 World Cups, scoring one goal in each; against Japan and Ghana, respectively. UEFA Women's Euro 2009 marked her last appearance in an international tournament. She had scored an important goal in the qualification play-off against Scotland.

References

External links
 

1973 births
Living people
Russian women's footballers
Russia women's international footballers
FIFA Century Club
Russian Women's Football Championship players
People from Ussuriysk
Sportspeople from Primorsky Krai
WFC Rossiyanka players
Ryazan-VDV players
FC Energy Voronezh players
Zvezda 2005 Perm players
FC Lada Togliatti (women) players
1999 FIFA Women's World Cup players
2003 FIFA Women's World Cup players
Women's association football midfielders
Women's association football forwards